The Tafelmusik Baroque Orchestra (also known simply as Tafelmusik) is a Canadian Baroque orchestra specializing in early music and based in Toronto. They often perform with choir and play period instruments.

The orchestra was founded in 1979 by oboist Kenneth Solway and bassoonist Susan Graves. Violinist Jeanne Lamon served as Music Director from 1981 to 2014. Lamon then held the title of Chief Artistic Advisor until 2017 when Italian violinist Elisa Citterio was appointed the new Music Director. Lamon continued to perform and tour with the orchestra in a reduced capacity until her death from lung cancer in 2021. Citterio left abruptly in early 2022 and the orchestra is now searching for a new music director.

The orchestra has nineteen full-time members who specialize in historical performance and technique, with additional musicians joining the ensemble when required.

The Tafelmusik Chamber Choir, under the direction of Ivars Taurins, was formed in 1981 to complement the orchestra.

Performing 
Tafelmusik performs over 50 concerts for its subscription season at its home venue in Trinity-St. Paul's United Church, a historic church in the Annex neighbourhood of Toronto, with selected performances at the George Weston Recital Hall in the Toronto Centre for the Arts and at Koerner Hall, TELUS Centre for the Performing Arts, Royal Conservatory of Music. They also collaborate with Opera Atelier multiple times each season, operating as Opera Atelier's pit orchestra for their performances at the Elgin Theatre in downtown Toronto.

Tafelmusik's annual Messiah and Sing Along Messiah, traditionally held at Massey Hall, have become very popular events during Toronto's Christmas season.

The orchestra tours about twelve weeks each year across Canada, the United States, and Europe. It has also toured in the People's Republic of China, Hong Kong, Korea, and Japan, as well as Australia, New Zealand, Israel and Greece.

From 1993 to 2011, Tafelmusik was orchestra in residence at the German Klang und Raum Festival in the small village of Irsee in Bavaria.

The University of Toronto Faculty of Music has partnered with Tafelmusik and appointed the Tafelmusik Baroque Orchestra as its Baroque Orchestra in Residence.

In 2002 the Tafelmusik Baroque Summer Institute was created to provide pre-professional and professional musicians with a unique training programme in instrumental and vocal baroque performance practice. The institute is a two-week program consisting of masterclasses, private lessons, choral and orchestral rehearsals, chamber ensemble work, lectures and seminars, and baroque dance classes. Tafelmusik also runs the Tafelmusik Winter Institute, a one-week intensive training program launched in 2013.

The orchestra also performs without sheet music in several multimedia shows celebrating the history of music and musical instruments. Their production J. S. Bach: The Circle of Creation has toured internationally.

In 2017, the orchestra played at the swearing-in ceremony of Julie Payette, former astronaut, as Governor General of Canada; Payette is a former member of the choir.

Awards 
 9 JUNO Awards, most recently for Classical Album of the Year for Beethoven's Symphonies Nos. 5 and 6, and Children's Album Of The Year for Baroque Adventure: The Quest for Arundo Donax
 The 1996 Echo Klassik Award for Best Orchestra of the Year (Germany's highest recording accolade)

The orchestra's recordings have also received the following awards:
 Editor's Choice in Gramophone Magazine
 Recording of the Month in BBC Music Magazine
 Diapason D'Or awards
 Record of the Year in Absolute Sound Magazine
 Disc of the Month in CD Review
 Nominations for Record of the Year in Gramophone Magazine
 England's The Penguin Guide awarded Tafelmusik's recording of Vivaldi's The Four Seasons its highest accolade — the Rosette in 1994.

Discography 
The orchestra has made over 75 recordings, DVDs and CDs. Some are to be found in Sony Classical's Vivarte series. Tafelmusik launched the independent label Tafelmusik Media in January 2012, with new releases of The Galileo Project (CD and DVD), Sing-Along Messiah (DVD), and Messiah (CD), as well as re-releases of Tafelmusik CDs originally recorded for Sony and CBC Records.

The recordings include:
 Bach's Brandenburg Concertos
 The Mozart Requiem (directed by Bruno Weil)
 The complete piano concertos of Beethoven (with Jos van Immerseel as soloist and conducted by Bruno Weil)
 Works by Wilhelm Friedemann Bach
 Handel's Music for the Royal Fireworks coupled with Concerti a duo cori Nos. 1-3
 Works by Salamone Rossi

References

External links
 http://www.tafelmusik.org/
 Colbert Artists Management Inc.
 Interview with Jeanne Lamon, November 11, 1993

Musical groups established in 1979
Canadian orchestras
Musical groups from Toronto
Early music orchestras
Juno Award for Children's Album of the Year winners
1979 establishments in Ontario
Juno Award for Classical Album of the Year – Large Ensemble or Soloist(s) with Large Ensemble Accompaniment winners
Juno Award for Classical Album of the Year – Vocal or Choral Performance winners